Mary Elizabeth Barkworth (born 1941, Marlborough, England) is an American botanist and professor emerita at Utah State University in Logan, Utah.

Education and career 
Barkworth has a B.Sc. from the University of British Columbia, and went on to teach school in British Columbia after graduation. She has an M.Ed. and a Ph.D. in 1975 from Western Washington University where she worked on variation in Brodiaea. Following her Ph.D. she worked with Agriculture Canada until moving to Utah State University in 1979, where she also served as the director of the Intermountain Herbarium. Barkworth retired in 2012.

Barkworth is known for her work on grasses, particularly members of the Stipeae and Triticeae. She also had responsibility for production of the two grass volumes in the Flora of North America. Barkworth has worked to digitize collections at OpenHerbarium.org, which includes collections from Pakistan and Somaliland. In 2013 Barkworth established a collaboration with the Daggett County Jail whereby inmates helped catalogue specimens through a collaboration between the herbarium and the jail.

Selected publications

References

External links
OpenHerbarium.org

1941 births
Living people
Botanists
Agrostologists
Western Washington University alumni
Utah State University faculty